Kylesku is a small, remote fishing hamlet in Sutherland in the Scottish Highlands. Until 1984, it was the site of a free ferry.

Village
Kylesku is located where Loch Glencoul and Loch Gleann Dubh join to form a sea passage Loch a' Chàirn Bhàin which links to Eddrachillis Bay. It is in the Scottish council area of Highland.

The village stretches back along the road from the slipway that used to be the southern end of the ferry crossing. Now by-passed by the main road carried over the bridge, the Kylesku Hotel overlooks the slipway. Nearby is Eas a' Chual Aluinn, Britain's highest waterfall. This can be visited on a boat trip aboard Rachael Clare.

Kylesku sits at the centre of a  area which has become Scotland's first 'Global Geopark'. There is abundant wildlife and a wide range of outdoor pursuits in or on the lochs, mountains and white sandy beaches, including bird watching, seal and otter spotting, fishing, climbing and hill walking.

Ferry

There was a passenger ferry (a rowing boat) in the early 19th century. Commercial traffic mainly comprised cattle on their way to central Scotland, and they had to swim across. Over the years, various ferries came and went, and small car-carrying ferries first appeared between the wars. The Kylesku Ferry was unusual in being free for much of its life.

The Maid of Kylesku, a two car ferry, was built for the Kylesku crossing in the early 1950s, where it was operated until replaced by the Queen of Kylesku in 1967. When no longer needed, the Maid of Kylesku was beached on the opposite side of the bay.

After the opening of the Kylesku Bridge, it was used as the Corran Ferry.

Bridge
The ferry service became known as a dreaded bottleneck on the route and was replaced by the Kylesku Bridge in 1984. The curving, five-span, continuous, pre-stressed concrete, hollow bridge has been described as one of the most beautiful bridges in the world. The bridge was built by Morrison Construction Group and designed by the architects Arup (intended to complement the natural beauty of the site), and it has won several design and construction awards.

A cairn on the north side, erected in 1993, commemorates the 50th anniversary of the formation of the XIIth Submarine Flotilla, a unit of "X-craft" and "Chariot" miniature submarines, which trained in Lochs Glendhu and Glencoul from 1943.

Footnotes

Ferry transport in Scotland
Populated places in Sutherland
Transport in Highland (council area)